Hovea elliptica, commonly known as the tree hovea or karri blue bush, is an ornamental plant in the family Fabaceae that is native to Western Australia. This plant was cited as Hovea Celsi in Description des plantes rares cultivees a Malmaison et a Navarre by Aimé Jacques Alexandre Bonpland.

Description
It is usually single stemmed and the young branches are covered in spreading often rust coloured hairs. The species has purple or blue flowers that appear between August and December in its native range. The pea shaped flowers are arranged in short clusters among the leaf axils. The axillary inflorescences contain one to seven flowers.

Taxonomy
The species was first formally in 1808 as Poiretia elliptica by James Edward Smith in 1808 in the work Characters of Platylobium, Bossiaea and of a new Genus named Poiretia as published in Transactions of the Linnean Society of London. It was later transferred to the genus Hovea by the botanist Augustin Pyramus de Candolle in 1825 in the work Leguminosae. Prodromus Systematis Naturalis Regni Vegetabilis. Numerous synonyms are known including Goodia simplicifolia as described by Kurt Polycarp Joachim Sprengel in 1827, Phusicarpos elliptica by Jean Louis Marie Poiret in 1816 and Platychilum celsianum by Jean-Claude Michel Mornant de Launay in 1819.

Distribution
It occurs on sand dunes, slopes ridges and granite outcrops in the South West and Great Southern regions of Western Australia where it grows in clay, loamy, sandy and gravelly lateritic soils often rich in organic matter. Usually part of the understorey in jarrah, marri and karri forest communities and is often associated with Bossiaea aquifolium subsp. laidlawiana and Hovea chorizemifolia.

Cultivation
It is sold commercially as seedlings or in seed form, the seeds germinate readily but need to be scarified or pre-treated with boiling water. The plant prefers well-drained soils and an open sunny or partly shaded position. It is drought tolerant but frost tender.

References

External links

National Library of Australia Hovea celsi paint

elliptica
Rosids of Western Australia
Plants described in 1825
Taxa named by Augustin Pyramus de Candolle